Skidmore is an unincorporated community in Breitung Township, Dickinson County, Michigan, United States.

Notes

Unincorporated communities in Dickinson County, Michigan
Unincorporated communities in Michigan
Iron Mountain micropolitan area